is a Japanese footballer who plays for Júbilo Iwata.

Club statistics
Updated to 18 February 2019.

References

External links
 Profile at Shimizu S-Pulse

1996 births
Living people
Association football people from Tochigi Prefecture
Japanese footballers
J1 League players
J2 League players
J3 League players
Shimizu S-Pulse players
Tochigi SC players
J.League U-22 Selection players
Júbilo Iwata players
Association football forwards